The Broad Street station is a station on the BMT Nassau Street Line of the New York City Subway at the intersection of Broad and Wall Streets in the Financial District of Manhattan. It serves as the southern terminal for J trains at all times and for Z trains during rush hours in the peak direction.

The station was built as part of the Dual Contracts, signed between the Brooklyn Rapid Transit Company (later reorganized as the Brooklyn–Manhattan Transit Corporation, or BMT) and the city in 1913. The Nassau Street Line was one of the last lines to be completed under the Dual Contracts, and construction did not proceed until James Walker was elected as mayor of New York City in 1926. This station opened on May 29, 1931, as part of the final portion of the Nassau Street Line. Despite being under Broad and Nassau Streets, with Wall Street as the cross-street, this station was named after Broad Street to prevent confusion with other stations. Between 1990 and 2015, Broad Street was only open on weekdays and weekday nights.

History

Planning and construction 
On March 19, 1913, the Brooklyn Rapid Transit Company (later reorganized as the Brooklyn–Manhattan Transit Corporation, or BMT) and the city signed Contract 4 of the Dual Contracts, which provided for the construction of certain lines. Most of the construction was completed by 1924, but the BMT Nassau Street Line was not yet completed. The BMT chairman Gerhard Dahl was persistent at requesting that the city build the line, but Mayor John Hylan refused to act during his final two years as mayor. Once James Walker succeeded him as mayor, contracts for the project were awarded, with the portion south of Liberty Street being awarded to Moranti and Raymond.

Work was projected to be completed in 39 months, and in March 1929, sixty percent of the work had been finished. As a result, 89 buildings had to be underpinned to ensure that they would stay on their foundations. Construction had to be done 20 feet below the active IRT Lexington Avenue Line. An area filled with quicksand with water, which used to belong to a spring, was found between John Street and Broad Street. Construction was done at night so as to not disturb workers in the Financial District.

Operation 

The Broad Street station opened on May 29, 1931, to complete the BMT Nassau Street Line, or "Nassau Street Loop", from its previous terminus at Chambers Street through this station and to a connection to the Montague Street Tunnel, which allowed trains to run to Brooklyn. The line's completion allowed subway trains to operate via the Culver Line, whose operation used to consist of elevated trains that ran to Ninth Avenue, where transfers were made to West End subway trains. The new line provided an additional ten percent capacity more than the existing service through DeKalb Avenue. Service on the Jamaica Line was extended to operate to this station.

The station is under Broad and Nassau Streets, with Wall Street as the cross-street, but was named after Broad Street to distinguish it from the two other Wall Street stations nearby, at Broadway and at William Street. From September 30, 1990, to June 14, 2015, the Broad and Fulton Street stations were closed during weekends, making them two of the four New York City Subway stations that lacked full-time service (the remaining two being the platforms for the 42nd Street Shuttle).

Proposed elevators
A proposed skyscraper at 45 Broad Street will provisionally include an entrance to the station that contains elevators, making the station compliant with the Americans with Disabilities Act of 1990. The plans call for two elevators, one for each platform, at the northeastern and southwestern corners of Broad Street and Exchange Place. The New York City Council approved the construction of the elevators in July 2018, and granted the developers an additional  in zoning rights in exchange for building the elevators.

Residents and tenants of 15 and 30 Broad Street opposed construction of glass-and-metal elevators, saying they posed a risk for terrorist attacks; the buildings' occupants hired a security consultant who determined they were a terrorist risk. However, the Metropolitan Transportation Authority hired its own security consultant who found they would not make the area more prone to terrorist attacks. Regular riders at the Broad Street station also advocated for the elevators because only six of the 30 stations served by the J and Z trains were wheelchair-accessible .

Station layout

This station has two tracks and two side platforms. South of this station, there are two center stub tracks ending at bumper blocks used for laying-up and relaying trains. Further south, the two tracks of the BMT Nassau Street Line merge with the BMT Broadway Line via a flying junction as it enters the Montague Street Tunnel into Downtown Brooklyn. No regular service has used this connection since the  train was re-routed from the Nassau Street Line to the IND Sixth Avenue Line in June 2010.

Trains terminate on the southbound track. Trains continue to one of the two relay tracks before returning on the northbound track to start northbound service to northern Brooklyn and Queens. There is also a single switch north of the station to enable trains on the southbound track to return to the northbound track.

This station was renovated in the late 1990s and a mosaic design was added to the platform walls. Beneath a small green and gold trim-line is a larger gold trim-line with a maroon border and white "B" and "BROAD ST" tablets on a blue-green background at regular intervals.

Exits

This station has three entrances/exits. The full-time entrance/exit is at the north end above the platforms. Two staircases from each side go up to a mezzanine containing a turnstile bank and station agent's booth. Outside of fare control, two street stairs go up to the southeastern corner of Wall and Broad Streets (outside 23 Wall Street). Two more street stairs go up to the southwestern corner of the same intersection and lie outside of the New York Stock Exchange Building (NYSE). After the September 11 attacks in 2001, the stair facing away from Wall Street was closed off by the New York City Police Department, which had instituted a security zone around the NYSE. In 2012, the stair facing towards Wall Street was closed when the security zone was reorganized. In 2017, the two exits were proposed to be sealed as part of general improvements in that area, but no action was taken. In 2019, the MTA again proposed permanently closing and removing the stairways to allow the NYSE to improve the streetscape just outside the building.

The other two fare entrances/exits are unstaffed and at platform level. The northbound platform has a part-time bank of both regular and HEET turnstiles and three street stairs, one to the northeastern corner of Exchange Place and Broad Street (outside 15 Broad Street) and two along Broad Street between Exchange Place and Beaver Street  (outside the Broad Exchange Building). The southbound platform has turnstiles that were originally HEET access, but were converted to exit-only following the elimination of through service at this station. Two staircases go to Broad Street between Exchange Place and Beaver Street, outside 30 Broad Street. A third on the southwestern corner of Exchange Place and Broad Street was closed and sealed. There is another exit-only staircase at the station leading to the northwestern corner of Broad Street and Exchange Place. It was previously closed by the New York City Police Department as well, but was reopened when security zone was reorganized.

Outside of fare control, the station's main entrance/exit has a long passage that is only open weekdays from 7:00 a.m. to 6:00 p.m. It runs north three blocks to the basement of 28 Liberty Street, where two sets of doors and a wide staircase lead to an unmarked entrance/exit at the east side of Nassau Street at Cedar Street. This entrance also provides access to the Wall Street/William Street station and the Wall Street/Broadway station. The passage also has two closed exits; one led to the northwestern corner of Wall Street and Nassau Street and was closed by 1992. The other led to the northwestern corner of Cedar Street and Nassau Street, near 140 Broadway, but was closed by 1999 and has since been repurposed into an emergency exit. Halfway through the passage, a short staircase from the west side leads up to a narrower passageway that runs through the basement of the Equitable Building before two offset High Entrance/Exit Turnstiles provide entrance to the Wall Street/Broadway station. Inside fare control, the passage splits in half with each branch leading to either side platform of Wall Street. Free connections between the BMT Nassau Street Line and IRT Lexington Avenue Line are available at the next three stations north (Fulton Street, Chambers Street, and Canal Street).

References

External links 

 
 Station Reporter — J Train
 Nassau Street entrance (via Chase Plaza) from Google Maps Street View
 Broad and Wall Streets western entrance from Google Maps Street View
 Broad and Wall Streets eastern entrance from Google Maps Street View
 Broad Street and Exchange Place entrance-only from Google Maps Street View
 Broad Street and Exchange Place exit-only from Google Maps Street View
 Platform from Google Maps Street View

BMT Nassau Street Line stations
Broad Street (Manhattan)
Financial District, Manhattan
New York City Subway stations in Manhattan
New York City Subway terminals
Railway stations in the United States opened in 1931
Wall Street